The Beautiful and Damned is a 1922 novel by American writer F. Scott Fitzgerald. Set in New York City, the novel's plot follows a young artist Anthony Patch and his flapper wife Gloria Gilbert who become "wrecked on the shoals of dissipation" while excessively partying at the dawn of the hedonistic Jazz Age. As Fitzgerald's second novel, the work focuses upon the swinish behavior and glittering excesses of the American social elite in the heyday of New York's café society. 

Fitzgerald modeled the characters of Anthony Patch on himself and Gloria Gilbert on his newlywed spouse Zelda Fitzgerald. The novel draws circumstantially upon the early years of Fitzgeralds' tempestuous marriage following the unexpected success of the author's first novel This Side of Paradise. At the time of their wedding in 1920, Fitzgerald claimed neither he nor Zelda loved each other, and the early years of their marriage in New York City were more akin to a friendship.

Having reflected upon the criticisms of his debut novel This Side of Paradise, Fitzgerald sought to improve upon the form and construction of his prose in The Beautiful and Damned and to venture into a new genre of fiction altogether. Consequently, he revised his second novel based on editorial suggestions from his friend Edmund Wilson and his editor Max Perkins. When reviewing the manuscript, Perkins commended the conspicuous evolution of Fitzgerald's literary craftsmanship.

Metropolitan Magazine serialized the manuscript in late 1921, and Charles Scribner's Sons published the book in March 1922. Scribner's prepared an initial print run of 20,000 copies. It sold well enough to warrant additional print runs reaching 50,000 copies. Despite the considerable sales, many critics typically consider the work to be among Fitzgerald's weaker novels. During the final decade of his life, Fitzgerald remarked upon the novel's lack of quality in a letter to his wife: "I wish The Beautiful and Damned had been a maturely written book because it was all true. We ruined ourselves—I have never honestly thought that we ruined each other."

Plot summary 

In 1913, Anthony Patch is a twenty-five year old Harvard University alumnus recently having returned from Rome and now residing in New York City. He is the presumptive heir to his dying grandfather's vast fortune. Through his friend Richard "Dick" Caramel, Anthony meets Gloria Gilbert, a beautiful flapper and "jazz baby" who is Dick's cousin. Anthony begins courting her. The couple fall madly in love, with Gloria ecstatically exclaiming: "Mother says that two souls are sometimes created together—and in love before they're born." After a whirlwind courtship, Anthony and Gloria decide to marry.

For the first three years of their married life together, Anthony and Gloria vow to adhere to "the magnificent attitude of not giving a damn... for what they chose to do and what consequences it brought. Not to be sorry, not to lose one cry of regret, to live according to a clear code of honor toward each other, and to seek the moment's happiness as fervently and persistently as possible." Gloria and Anthony's marital bliss soon evaporates, especially when they are each pitted against the other's selfish attitudes. Once the couple's infatuation with each other fades, they begin to see their differences do more harm than good, as well as leaving each other with unfulfilled hopes. Over time, the disappointed couple become hedonistic and cynical libertines.

When Anthony's grandfather learns of Anthony's dissipation, he disinherits him. During World War I, Anthony briefly serves in the American Expeditionary Forces while Gloria remains home alone until his return. While in army training, Anthony has an extramarital liaison with Dot Raycroft, a lower-class Southern woman. After the Allied Powers sign an armistice with Imperial Germany in November 1918, Anthony returns to New York City and reunites with Gloria. When the struggle over the grandfather's inheritance finally concludes, Anthony wins his inheritance. However, he has now become a hopeless alcoholic, and his wife has lost her beauty. The couple are now wealthy but morally and physically ruined.

At the end, Anthony Patch—echoing his grandfather—describes his inherited wealth as a consequence of his character rather than mere circumstance: "Only a few months before people had been urging him to give in, to submit to mediocrity... But he had known that he was justified in his way of life—and he had stuck it out staunchly... 'I showed them... It was a hard fight, but I didn't give up and I came through!"

Major characters 

 Anthony Patcha Harvard alumnus and incorrigible loafer who is an heir to his grandfather's large fortune. He is unambitious, and therefore unmotivated to work even as he pursues various careers. He is enthralled by Gloria Gilbert's beauty and falls in love with her immediately. He is drafted into the United States Army, but the war ends before he is sent overseas. Throughout the novel he compensates for a lack of vocation with parties and ingravescent alcoholism. His expectations of future wealth make him powerless to act in the present, leaving him with empty relationships in the end.
 Gloria Gilberta beautiful flapper and "jazz baby" from Kansas City whom Anthony marries. She contributes to his decline through her extravagant spending. Self-absorbed, her personality revolves around her beauty and a belief that this quality makes her more important than everyone else. The character was loosely based on Fitzgerald's wife Zelda. Fitzgerald wrote a letter to his daughter Scottie delineating the differences between Gloria and Zelda: "Gloria was a much more trivial and vulgar person than your mother. I can't really say there was any resemblance except in the beauty and certain terms of expression she used, and also I naturally used many circumstantial events of our early married life. However the emphases were entirely different. We had a much better time than Anthony and Gloria had".
 Richard "Dick" Caramelan aspiring author who is one of Anthony's best friends and also Gloria's cousin. He is the one who brings Anthony and Gloria together. During the course of the book he publishes his novel The Demon Lover and basks in his notoriety for a good amount of time after publication. 
 Joseph Bloeckmana Jewish film producer who is in love with Gloria and hopes she will leave Anthony for him. Gloria and Bloeckman had a budding relationship when Gloria met Anthony. He continues to be friends with Gloria, giving Anthony some suspicion of an extramarital affair.
 Dorothy "Dot" Raycrofta lower-class Southern woman with whom Anthony has an affair during his army training. She is a lost soul looking for someone to share her life with. She falls in love with Anthony despite learning that he is married, causes problems between Gloria and Anthony, and spurs Anthony's decline in mental health.

Writing and production 

Following the success of his debut novel This Side of Paradise in March 1920, F. Scott Fitzgerald became a household name. His new fame enabled him to earn much higher rates for his short stories, and his increased financial prospects persuaded his fiancée Zelda Sayre to marry him as Fitzgerald could now pay for her accustomed lifestyle. Although they were re-engaged, Fitzgerald's feelings for Zelda were at an all-time low, and he remarked to a friend, "I wouldn't care if she died, but I couldn't stand to have anybody else marry her." Despite mutual reservations, they married in a simple ceremony on April 3, 1920, at St. Patrick's Cathedral, New York. At the time of their wedding, Fitzgerald claimed neither he nor Zelda still loved each other, and the early years of their stormy marriage in New York City were more akin to a friendship.

Living in luxury at the Biltmore Hotel in New York City, the newlywed couple became national celebrities, as much for their wild behavior as for the success of Fitzgerald's novel. At the Biltmore, Scott did handstands in the lobby, while Zelda slid down the hotel banisters. After several weeks, the hotel asked them to leave for disturbing other guests. The couple relocated two blocks to the Commodore Hotel on 42nd Street where they spent half-an-hour spinning in the revolving door. Fitzgerald likened their juvenile behavior in New York City to two "small children in a great bright unexplored barn." Writer Dorothy Parker first encountered the couple riding on the roof of a taxi. "They did both look as though they had just stepped out of the sun", Parker recalled, "their youth was striking. Everyone wanted to meet him."

Fitzgerald's ephemeral happiness mirrored the societal giddiness of the Jazz Age, a term which he popularized in his essays and stories. He described the era as racing "along under its own power, served by great filling stations full of money." In Fitzgerald's eyes, the era represented a morally permissive time when Americans became disillusioned with prevailing social norms and obsessed with self-gratification. During this hedonistic era, alcohol increasingly fueled the Fitzgeralds' social life, and the couple consumed gin-and-fruit concoctions at every outing. Publicly, their alcohol intake meant little more than napping at parties, but privately it led to bitter quarrels. As their quarrels worsened, the couple accused each other of marital infidelities. They remarked to friends that their marriage would not last much longer.

In August 1920 while in Westport, Connecticut, Fitzgerald began work on his second novel. The novel had several working titles such as The Beautiful Lady Without Mercy and The Flight of the Rocket.  On August 12th, Fitzgerald described the plot of the novel to Charles Scribner as focusing upon the life of an artist who lacks creative inspiration and who, after marrying a beautiful woman, is "wrecked on the shoals of dissipation". The writing of the novel was interrupted as his wife Zelda wished to return to the Deep South since "she missed peaches and biscuits for breakfast." After an excursion to Montgomery, Alabama, the couple returned to Westport where Fitzgerald resumed work on his novel. While Fitzgerald worked on his second novel, his wife Zelda realized she was pregnant in February 1921, and the couple began planning a trip overseas to Europe. 

Throughout the winter and spring of 1921–22, Fitzgerald wrote and rewrote various drafts of The Beautiful and Damned. Fitzgerald modeled the spoiled characters of Anthony Patch on himself and Gloria Patch on—in his words—the chill-minded selfishness of his wife. The novel draws circumstantially upon the early years of Fitzgeralds' tempestuous marriage following the meteoric success of the author's first novel This Side of Paradise. Fitzgerald divided the work in pre-publication into three major parts: "The Pleasant Absurdity of Things", "The Romantic Bitterness of Things", and "The Ironic Tragedy of Things". In the final book form, however, the novel consists of untitled "books" of three chapters each. 

Having digested criticisms of his debut novel This Side of Paradise, Fitzgerald sought to improve upon the form and construction of his prose and to venture into a new genre of fiction altogether. Consequently, he revised The Beautiful and Damned based on editorial suggestions from his friend Edmund Wilson and his editor Max Perkins. When reviewing the manuscript, Perkins commended the conspicuous evolution of Fitzgerald's literary craftsmanship. Fitzgerald dedicated the novel to the Irish writer Shane Leslie, George Jean Nathan, and Maxwell Perkins "in appreciation of much literary help and encouragement". 

While finalizing the novel, Fitzgerald traveled with his wife to Europe, and his agent Harold Ober sold the serialization rights for The Beautiful and Damned to Metropolitan Magazine for $7,000. The chapters were serialized by Metropolitan from September 1921 to March 1922. Shortly before the novel's publication in book form by Charles Scribner's Sons, Zelda Fitzgerald made a sketch in which she envisioned the dust-jacket for her husband's novel. Her sketch depicted a naked flapper sitting in a cocktail glass. Ultimately, the publisher would use an illustration by William E. Hill for the dust-jacket. On March 4, 1922, the book was published by Scribner's. The publisher prepared an initial print run of approximately 20,000 copies, and The Beautiful and Damned sold well enough to warrant additional print runs reaching 50,000 copies.

Critical reception 

With his second work, The Beautiful and Damned, Fitzgerald discarded the trappings of collegiate bildungsromans as epitomized in his preceding novel This Side of Paradise and crafted an "ironical-pessimistic"  novel in the style of Thomas Hardy's oeuvre. The relentless pessimism of the novel would become a point of contention with many critics. Louise Field of The New York Times found the novel showed Fitzgerald to be talented but too pessimistic. Likewise, critic Fanny Butcher lamented that Fitzgerald had traded the bubbly giddiness of This Side of Paradise for a sequel which plumbed "the bitter dregs of reality."

With the publication of this sophomore effort, critics promptly noticed an evolution in the artistry and quality of Fitzgerald's prose. Whereas This Side of Paradise had been universally castigated by critics for its chaotic prose, The Beautiful and Damned displayed greater form and construction as well as an awakened literary consciousness. Paul Rosenfeld commented that certain passages easily rivaled D. H. Lawrence in their artistry. Remarking upon Fitzgerald's improved craftsmanship, literary critic H. L. Mencken wrote in his The Smart Set review: "There are a hundred signs in it of serious purpose and unquestionable skill. Even in its defects there is proof of hard striving. Fitzgerald ceases to be a wunderkind, and begins to come into his maturity".

Despite this significant improvement in form and construction over This Side of Paradise, critics deemed The Beautiful and Damned to be far less ground-breaking than his debut work. Whereas critics felt that This Side of Paradise had pulsed with originality, they were less ecstatic over The Beautiful and Damned.  Fanny Butcher feared that "Fitzgerald had a brilliant future ahead of him in 1920" but, "unless he does something better... it will be behind him in 1923." 

Other reviewers such as John V. A. Weaver recognized that the vast improvement in literary form and construction between his first and second novels augured great prospects for Fitzgerald's future. Weaver predicted that, as Fitzgerald matured into a better writer, he would become regarded as one of the greatest authors of American literature. Consequently, expectations arose that Fitzgerald would significantly improve with his third work, The Great Gatsby.

Over a century later, many literary critics typically consider The Beautiful and Damned to be among Fitzgerald's weaker novels. During the final decade of his life, Fitzgerald remarked upon the novel's lack of quality in a letter to his wife: "I wish The Beautiful and Damned had been a maturely written book because it was all true. We ruined ourselves—I have never honestly thought that we ruined each other."

Critical analysis 
Critics have analyzed The Beautiful and Damned as a morality tale, a meditation on love, money and decadence, and a social documentary. Such analyses often focus upon the characters' disproportionate absorption on their past—a fixation which tends to consume them in the present. The theme of absorption in the past also continues through much of Fitzgerald's later works, perhaps best summarized in the final line of his 1925 novel The Great Gatsby: "So we beat on, boats against the current, borne back ceaselessly into the past", which is inscribed on Fitzgerald's tombstone shared with Zelda in Maryland.

According to Fitzgerald scholar James L. W. West III, The Beautiful and Damned is concerned with the question of 'vocation': 'What does one do with oneself when one has nothing to do?' According to West, "Fitzgerald applied the question of vocation largely to his male characters, but he saw that women too needed meaningful roles in life." Fitzgerald presents Gloria as a woman whose vocation is nothing more than to catch a husband. After her marriage to Anthony, Gloria's sole vocation is to slide into indulgence and indolence, while her husband's sole vocation is to wait for his inheritance, during which time he slides into depression and alcoholism.

Authorship debate 

In April 1922, one month after the book's publication, Zelda Fitzgerald was asked by Scott's friend, humorist Burton Rascoe, to review the book for The New-York Tribune as a publicity stunt. Rascoe asked Zelda to pretend to review it and to insert deliberately "a rub here and there" in order to "cause a great deal of comment." Per Rascoe's instructions, Zelda titled her review "Friend Husband's Latest" and wrote "partly [as] a joke" that Fitzgerald had purloined a page of her diary:  As a consequence of this statement written in a satirical review by Zelda, various individuals such as Penelope Green have speculated that Zelda was perhaps a co-author of the novel, but most Fitzgerald scholars such as Matthew J. Bruccoli stated there is no evidence whatsoever to support this claim. Bruccoli states:

Adaptations 

A film adaptation in 1922, directed by William A. Seiter, starred Kenneth Harlan as Anthony Patch and Marie Prevost as Gloria. The film did well at the box office, and the critical reception was generally favorable. However, F. Scott Fitzgerald disliked the film, and he later wrote to a friend: "It's by far the worst movie I've ever seen in my life-cheap, vulgar, ill-constructed and shoddy. We were utterly ashamed of it."

Translations 
Due to the novel's popular success, there were French and German translations of the work.
A full Russian translation of The Beautiful and Damned by Perevod Shchennikova is also available.

References

Notes

Citations

Works cited

External links 

 
  
 The Beautiful and Damned at Internet Archive
 

1922 American novels
Modernist novels
Novels by F. Scott Fitzgerald
American novels adapted into films
Novels set in the Roaring Twenties
Novels set in New York City
Charles Scribner's Sons books